Siege of Dubrovnik may refer to:
 Siege of Dubrovnik (866–868), military conflict between Dubrovnik and the Aghlabids of Ifriqiya that lasted for fifteen months and was lifted at the approach of a Byzantine fleet
 Siege of Dubrovnik (1814), conflict fought between Dubrovnik insurgents, Austrian-Croat troops and the British Royal Navy against a French garrison during the Adriatic campaign of the Napoleonic Wars, resulted in Austrian-Croatian-British victory
 Siege of Dubrovnik (1991-1992), military attack of the Yugoslav People's Army (JNA) to capture Dubrovnik during the Croatian War of Independence, resulted in Croatian victory and Yugoslav troops withdrawal

See also
Bosnian–Ragusan War (1403–1404)
Operation Tiger (1992)